Francesco De Piccoli (born 29 November 1937) is a former Italian boxer, who won the gold medal in the heavyweight division (+91 kg) at the 1960 Summer Olympics in Rome.

Amateur career
De Piccoli started training in boxing in 1955, and won national heavyweight titles in 1959 and 1960. At the 1960 Olympics, he easily reached the final, in which he knocked out Daan Bekker after 90 seconds. He turned professional right after the Olympics. After retiring in 1965 he worked as a driving instructor.

Professional record

|-
|align="center" colspan=8|37 Wins (29 knockouts, 6 decisions, 2 DQs), 4 Losses (4 knockouts) 
|-
| align="center" style="border-style: none none solid solid; background: #e3e3e3"|Result
| align="center" style="border-style: none none solid solid; background: #e3e3e3"|Record
| align="center" style="border-style: none none solid solid; background: #e3e3e3"|Opponent
| align="center" style="border-style: none none solid solid; background: #e3e3e3"|Type
| align="center" style="border-style: none none solid solid; background: #e3e3e3"|Round
| align="center" style="border-style: none none solid solid; background: #e3e3e3"|Date
| align="center" style="border-style: none none solid solid; background: #e3e3e3"|Location
| align="center" style="border-style: none none solid solid; background: #e3e3e3"|Notes
|-align=center
|Loss
|
|align=left| Peter Weiland
|TKO
|2
|26/12/1965
|align=left| Mestre, Veneto
|align=left|
|-
|Loss
|
|align=left| Everett Copeland
|KO
|6
|15/10/1965
|align=left| Turin, Piedmont
|align=left|
|-
|Win
|
|align=left| Dave Duke Johnson
|KO
|1
|10/07/1965
|align=left| Mestre, Veneto
|align=left|
|-
|Win
|
|align=left| Sonny "Policeman" Moore
|KO
|1
|07/05/1965
|align=left| Rome, Lazio
|align=left|
|-
|Win
|
|align=left| Aaron Beasley
|KO
|2
|12/04/1965
|align=left| Bologna, Emilia-Romagna
|align=left|
|-
|Win
|
|align=left| Floyd Joyner
|KO
|1
|02/04/1965
|align=left| Turin, Piedmont
|align=left|
|-
|Win
|
|align=left| Billy "The Barber" Daniels
|PTS
|10
|19/02/1965
|align=left| Rome, Lazio
|align=left|
|-
|Win
|
|align=left| Herb Siler
|KO
|2
|23/01/1965
|align=left| Palasport di San Siro, Milan, Lombardy
|align=left|
|-
|Win
|
|align=left| Ollie Wilson
|KO
|4
|26/12/1964
|align=left| Mestre, Veneto
|align=left|
|-
|Win
|
|align=left| Ed Sonny Andrews
|KO
|1
|11/12/1964
|align=left| Palazzetto dello Sport, Rome, Lazio
|align=left|
|-
|Win
|
|align=left| Henry Wallitsch
|KO
|1
|12/11/1964
|align=left| Milan, Lombardy
|align=left|
|-
|Win
|
|align=left| S.F.C. Matthew Jackson
|DQ
|1
|18/09/1964
|align=left| Palazzetto dello Sport, Rome, Lazio
|align=left|
|-
|Win
|
|align=left| Lars Olaf Norling
|PTS
|10
|22/05/1964
|align=left| Sports Palace, Turin, Piedmont
|align=left|
|-
|Win
|
|align=left| Carl Welschou
|KO
|4
|11/05/1964
|align=left| Naples, Campania
|align=left|
|-
|Loss
|
|align=left| Joe Bygraves
|KO
|5
|07/06/1963
|align=left| Palazzetto dello Sport, Rome, Lazio
|align=left|
|-
|Loss
|
|align=left| Wayne Bethea
|KO
|4
|22/03/1963
|align=left| Palazzetto dello Sport, Rome, Lazio
|align=left|
|-
|Win
|
|align=left| Tony Hughes
|KO
|2
|01/03/1963
|align=left| Rome, Lazio
|align=left|
|-
|Win
|
|align=left| Neal Welch
|PTS
|10
|04/02/1963
|align=left| Mestre, Veneto
|align=left|
|-
|Win
|
|align=left| Howard "Honeyboy" King
|KO
|1
|18/01/1963
|align=left| Palazzetto dello Sport, Rome, Lazio
|align=left|
|-
|Win
|
|align=left| Wendell Newton
|TKO
|3
|30/11/1962
|align=left| Palazzetto dello Sport, Rome, Lazio
|align=left|
|-
|Win
|
|align=left| John Riggins
|KO
|1
|09/11/1962
|align=left| Rome, Lazio
|align=left|
|-
|Win
|
|align=left| Ray Shiel
|KO
|2
|22/10/1962
|align=left| Bologna, Emilia-Romagna
|align=left|
|-
|Win
|
|align=left| Phonse LaSaga
|KO
|1
|11/09/1962
|align=left| Palazzetto dello Sport, Rome, Lazio
|align=left|
|-
|Win
|
|align=left| Kurt Stroer
|KO
|2
|04/08/1962
|align=left| Genoa, Liguria
|align=left|
|-
|Win
|
|align=left| Buddy Turman
|DQ
|2
|19/07/1962
|align=left| Rome, Lazio
|align=left|
|-
|Win
|
|align=left| Calvin Butler
|KO
|8
|16/04/1962
|align=left| Bologna, Emilia-Romagna
|align=left|
|-
|Win
|
|align=left| Garvin Sawyer
|TKO
|4
|30/03/1962
|align=left| Rome, Lazio
|align=left|
|-
|Win
|
|align=left| Ulli Ritter
|KO
|4
|21/12/1961
|align=left| Rome, Lazio
|align=left|
|-
|Win
|
|align=left| Frankie Daniels
|PTS
|8
|09/09/1961
|align=left| Mestre, Veneto
|align=left|
|-
|Win
|
|align=left| Walter Haufft
|KO
|1
|31/08/1961
|align=left| Turin, Piedmont
|align=left|
|-
|Win
|
|align=left| Robert Duquesne
|KO
|1
|05/07/1961
|align=left| Plamino Stadium, Rome, Lazio
|align=left|
|-
|Win
|
|align=left| Jose Mariano Moracia Ibanes
|KO
|1
|10/06/1961
|align=left| Mestre, Veneto
|align=left|
|-
|Win
|
|align=left| Erwin Hack
|KO
|2
|02/06/1961
|align=left| Taranto, Apulia
|align=left|
|-
|Win
|
|align=left| Ossi Buettner
|KO
|3
|16/05/1961
|align=left| Turin, Piedmont
|align=left|
|-
|Win
|
|align=left| Werner Walloschek
|KO
|1
|03/05/1961
|align=left| Naples, Campania
|align=left|
|-
|Win
|
|align=left| Uwe Janssen
|TKO
|2
|07/04/1961
|align=left| PalaLido, Milan, Lombardy
|align=left|
|-
|Win
|
|align=left| Walter Haufft
|KO
|2
|01/04/1961
|align=left| Ascoli Piceno, Marche
|align=left|
|-
|Win
|
|align=left| Alain Cherville
|PTS
|6
|14/03/1961
|align=left| Bologna, Emilia-Romagna
|align=left|
|-
|Win
|
|align=left| Maurice Mols
|PTS
|6
|10/02/1961
|align=left| Palazzetto dello Sport, Rome, Lazio
|align=left|
|-
|Win
|
|align=left| Robert Warmbrunn
|KO
|1
|25/01/1961
|align=left| Mestre, Veneto
|align=left|
|-
|Win
|
|align=left| Giovanni Moriggi
|KO
|1
|26/12/1960
|align=left| Bologna, Emilia-Romagna
|align=left|
|}

References

External links
 

1937 births
Living people
Olympic boxers of Italy
Boxers at the 1960 Summer Olympics
Olympic gold medalists for Italy
Sportspeople from the Metropolitan City of Venice
Olympic medalists in boxing
Italian male boxers
Medalists at the 1960 Summer Olympics
Heavyweight boxers
People from Mestre-Carpenedo
20th-century Italian people